These are the official results of the Women's 100 metres Hurdles event at the 1983 IAAF World Championships in Helsinki, Finland. There were a total number of 35 participating athletes, with five qualifying heats, four quarter-finals, two semi-finals and the final held on Saturday 1983-08-13.

Medalists

Records
Existing records at the start of the event.

Final

Semi-finals
Held on Saturday 1983-08-13

Quarter-finals
Held on Friday 1983-08-12

Qualifying heats
Held on Friday 1983-08-12

References
 Results

H
Sprint hurdles at the World Athletics Championships
1983 in women's athletics